Xenophrys is a genus of amphibians in the family Megophryidae. They are found in southeastern Asia (including China and northeastern India) to Borneo. Their common name is strange-horned toads.

Conservation
Of the 36 Xenophrys species that the International Union for Conservation of Nature has evaluated, most are either "Data Deficient" or of "Least Concern". However, one species is considered "Critically Endangered" (Xenophrys damrei) "Endangered" (Xenophrys takensis), one is "Vulnerable" (Xenophrys auralensis), and six are "Near Threatened".

Taxonomy 
The genus was previously found to be strongly polyphyletic, and awaiting a better solution, they were synonymized in the genus Megophrys. Following subsequent studies and reclassification, the genus has been revalidated.

Species 
Presently, Amphibian Species of the World classifies the following 31 species in Xenophrys:
 Xenophrys aceras (Boulenger, 1903) — Perak horned toad
 Xenophrys ancrae (Mahony, Teeling & Biju, 2013) — Namdapha horned toadfrog
 Xenophrys auralensis (Ohler, Swan, and Daltry, 2002) — Aural horned toad
 Xenophrys awuh (Mahony, Kamei, Teeling, and Biju, 2020) — Naga Hills horned frog
 Xenophrys damrei (Mahony, 2011) — Damrei horned toad
 Xenophrys dzukou (Mahony, Kamei, Teeling, and Biju, 2020) — Dzükou Valley horned frog
 Xenophrys flavipunctata (Mahony, Kamei, Teeling, and Biju, 2018) — yellow spotted white-lipped horned frog
 Xenophrys glandulosa (Fei, Ye, and Huang, 1990) — glandular horned toad
 Xenophrys himalayana (Mahony, Kamei, Teeling, and Biju, 2018) — Himalayan horned frog
 Xenophrys lekaguli (Stuart, Chuaynkern, Chan-ard, and Inger, 2006) — Lekagul's horned toad
 Xenophrys longipes (Boulenger, 1886) — red-legged horned toad
 Xenophrys major (Boulenger, 1908) — Great Stream horned toad
 Xenophrys mangshanensis (Fei and Ye, 1990) — Mangshan horned toad
 Xenophrys maosonensis (Bourret, 1937) — Maoson horned toad
 Xenophrys medogensis (Fei, Ye, and Huang, 1983) — Medog horned toad
 Xenophrys megacephala (Mahony, Sengupta, Kamei, and Biju, 2011) — big-headed horned frog
 Xenophrys monticola Günther, 1864 — mountain horned frog
 Xenophrys numhbumaeng (Mahony, Kamei, Teeling, and Biju, 2020) — Tamenglong horned frog
 Xenophrys oreocrypta (Mahony, Kamei, Teeling, and Biju, 2018) — Garo white-lipped horned frog
 Xenophrys oropedion (Mahony, Teeling & Biju, 2013) — Shyllong horned toad
 Xenophrys pachyproctus (Huang, 1981) — convex-vented horned toad
 Xenophrys periosa (Mahony, Kamei, Teeling, and Biju, 2018) — giant Himalayan horned frog
 Xenophrys robusta (Boulenger, 1908) — robust horned toad
 Xenophrys serchhipii Mathew and Sen, 2007 — Serchhip horned toad
 Xenophrys takensis (Mahony, 2011) — Tak horned toad
 Xenophrys truongsonensis Luong, Hoang, Pham, Nguyen, Orlov, Ziegler, and Nguyen, 2022 — Truongson horned toad
 Xenophrys vegrandis (Mahony, Teeling, Biju, 2013) 
 Xenophrys yeae (Shi, Zhang, Xie, Jiang, Liu, Ding, Luan, and Wang, 2020) — Ye's horned toad
 Xenophrys zhangi (Ye and Fei, 1992) — Zhang's horned toad
 Xenophrys zhoui (Shi, Zhang, Xie, Jiang, Liu, Ding, Luan, and Wang, 2020) — Zhou's horned toad
 Xenophrys zunhebotoensis Mathew and Sen, 2007 — Zunheboto horned toad

References

 
Amphibians of Asia
Taxa named by Albert Günther
Taxonomy articles created by Polbot